Lamprologus kungweensis is a species of cichlid endemic to Lake Tanganyika where it is known from the northwestern part of the lake in Kungwe Bay, Kigoma, Tanzania where it can be found living in shells.  This species reaches a length of  TL.  This species can also be found in the aquarium trade.

References

kungweensis
Fish of Lake Tanganyika
Endemic freshwater fish of Tanzania
Taxa named by Max Poll
Fish described in 1956
Taxonomy articles created by Polbot